State Road 213 (NM 213) is a  state highway in the US state of New Mexico. NM 213's southern terminus is a continuation as Farm to Market Road 3255 (FM 3255) at the Texas/ New Mexico border, and the northern terminus is at the end of state maintenance by White Sands Missile Range.

Major intersections

See also

References

213
Transportation in Doña Ana County, New Mexico